A two-wheeler is a vehicle that runs on two wheels.

The two wheels may be arranged in tandem, one behind the other, as with single-track vehicles, or arranged and also side by side, on the same axle. If on the same axle, the vehicle may have no other support, as with dicycles, or have additional support, which is often also the source of motive power.

Wheeled single-track vehicles include:
 Dandy horses, velocipedes, or draisines, forerunners of bicycles
 Bicycles, a pedal-powered two-wheeler
 Motorcycles, a motor-powered two-wheeler, similar in construction with bicycles
 Gyrocars, a self-balancing car on two wheels

Dicycles include:
 Self-balancing scooters, also known as hoverboards
 Segway PTs, a brand of self-balancing personal transporters

Two-wheelers intended to be used with additional support, which is also the source of motive power, include:
 Cabriolets ("cabs") or hansom cabs on two wheels
 Curricle
 Gig (carriage)
 Tilbury (carriage)
 Trap (carriage)
 Hand trucks, two-wheeled devices used for transporting bulky or heavy items such as furniture or golf clubs (golf trolley)
 Shopping trolley (caddy)
 Many trailers, especially semi-trailers

Two-wheelers intended to be used with additional support, which is not the source of motive power, include:
 Two-wheel tractors

References

Broad-concept articles
Wheeled vehicles
Vehicles by type